Kothandaramar Temple is a Hindu temple located in the Tiruvarur district of Tamil Nadu, India, dedicated to Lord Rama, the seventh avatar of Lord Vishnu.

Location
It is located in the village of Paruthiyur in Kudavasal taluk.

Presiding deity

The presiding deity of the temple is Varadarajar. The temple is famed as Paruthiyur Rama Temple. Kothandaramar is facing south.  Rama is along with consort Sita, and Lakshmanan and Hanuman.  'Paruthiyur Periyava' * Shri Krishna Sastri, who had made pilgrimage throughout India and sang the praise of Rama, built this temple.

Other shrines

Shrines of Varadharajar, Mahalakshmi, Visvanathar and Visalakshi are found in this temple. Like Thillivilagam temple, one can worship both Siva and Vishnu  in this temple.

Paruthiyur Publications, '* ,Sarvam Rama Mayam', is the life history of Brahmasri Paruthiyur Periyava Ramayanam Shri Krishna Sastri and the book elaborates the sthala puranam of this temple.

Religious significance 

This is a special prathana sthalam for vedic pundits, discourse scholars, music and namasangirtan artists. This temple is one of the * Pancha Rama Kshetras  of Thiruvarur District. 

 Sri Kodhanda Ramar Temple, Mudikondan
 Sri Kodhanda Ramar Temple, Adambar
 Sri Kodhanda Ramar Temple, Paruthiyur   
 Sri Kodhanda Ramar Temple, Thillaivilagam
 Sri Kodhanda Ramar Temple, Vaduvur

References

External links
 Sarvam Rama Mayam
 Pancha Rama Kshetras
 Paruthiyur Krishna Sastri 
Paruthiyur Sthala Puranam

 கல்யாண வரமளிக்கும் கல்யாண வரதராஜர், தினகரன், 25 ஏப்ரல் 2014

Hindu temples in Tiruvarur district
Vishnu temples
Rama temples